Carpolite may refer to:

Carpolite in paleontology refers to a fossilized fruit, nut, or seed
Carpolite in construction for a limestone aggregate or crushed stone

See also
Carpholite, a manganese silicate mineral